Christopher Rawson (born Christopher Comstock Hart), is an American writer, university teacher and theater critic.

Rawson was born in Providence, Rhode Island. His biological father was noted stage and film actor Richard Hart. His parents divorced shortly after he was born, and he was adopted by his stepfather, Jonathan Rawson.

Biography 
Rawson's main discipline is as a theater critic. From 1983 to 2009, he was full-time theater critic and theater editor at the Pittsburgh Post-Gazette, covering theater not just in Pittsburgh but also irregularly in New York, London and the Canadian theater festivals. In 1984, he started the annual Post-Gazette (Pittsburgh) Performer of the Year Award, now (2019) in its 36th year. In 2009, he semi-retired, continuing as that paper's part-time senior theater critic. He also appears as the occasional critic for KDKA-TV. Mr. Rawson attended Deerfield Academy.  His B.A. is from Harvard University and his M.A. and Ph.D. from the University of Washington at Seattle.

Rawson is active in several theater organizations. He is a board member of the American Theatre Hall of Fame, for which he supervises the annual nominations and balloting for the selection of new inductees. He has long been active in the American Theatre Critics Association (ATCA), which he has twice served as chair (1991–93 and 2007–11) and for which he has organized conferences in London, at Connecticut's O'Neill Theater Center, at Canada's Shaw and Stratford Festivals and at the Oregon Shakespeare Festival. In 2019 he was named ATCA Historian and he continues to chronicle its history through its website at www.americantheatrecritics.org. He was also a founding member of the ATCA Foundation and continues on its Board. For some years he was on the editorial board of Best Plays, the standard theater yearbook established in 1920 by Burns Mantle

From 1968, and as Emeritus since 2018, Rawson was a member of the English faculty at the University of Pittsburgh, where he taught courses primarily in satire, Shakespeare, critical writing, Irish drama, and the work of playwright August Wilson. He came to know Wilson and his plays well through covering him since 1984 for the playwright's hometown newspaper of record. In 1999, when the eighth play ("King Hedley II") in what would become a 10-play cycle had its world premiere, in his Dec. 15 column in the Pittsburgh Post-Gazette, he was the first to name it the "Pittsburgh Cycle". Since then, the August Wilson Estate has named it the American Century Cycle, and both names are now used. Rawson is on the Board of Trustees (as secretary) and serves as program chair of the Daisy Wilson Artist Community, named for Wilson's mother, which is restoring August Wilson House at 1727 Bedford Ave. in Pittsburgh's Hill District, where Wilson lived his first 12 years and where his cycle of 10 plays can be said to have begun.

Since 2001 Rawson has produced Off the Record, an annual musical theater satire of Pittsburgh news and newsmakers which raises funds for the Greater Pittsburgh Community Food Bank and other charities. In 1999, he wrote Where Stone Walls Meet the Sea, a 600-page centennial history of the Donald Ross-designed Sakonnet Golf Club in Little Compton, Rhode Island and of the summer colony of which it is a part. He and Laurence A. Glasco have written August Wilson: Pittsburgh Places in His Life and Plays (Pittsburgh History & Landmarks Foundation, 2nd edition, 2015) and their larger work, August Wilson's Pittsburgh, is expected in 2022, to be published by the University of Pittsburgh Press.

References

External links 
 Pittsburgh Post-Gazette
 Christopher Rawson piece on Richard Hart

Living people
Year of birth missing (living people)
American theater critics
Writers from Pittsburgh
Harvard University alumni
University of Washington alumni
University of Pittsburgh faculty
Pittsburgh Post-Gazette people